The electoral district of Mooroolbark was an electoral district of the Legislative Assembly in the Australian state of Victoria.

The seat was abolished at the 2002 election, with the majority of the electorate being replaced by the new seat of Kilsyth.

Members

Election results

References

Former electoral districts of Victoria (Australia)
1992 establishments in Australia
2002 disestablishments in Australia